Tope Adenibuyan popularly known as Teddy A is a Nigerian Reality TV star, singer, and actor. He is well known for his roles in Foreigner's God.

Early life and education 
He was born in Lagos Nigeria before relocating to the United States of America where he obtained his degree at the University of Texas.

Personal life 
Teddy A is married to his fellow housemate at Big Brother Nigeria Bamike Olawunmi and they are blessed with two children.

Musical career 
Teddy A started his musical career in the United States and has produced singles and collaborations with popular musicians such as Timaya, P-Square, Wizkid, and Flavour.

References 

Living people
Nigerian rappers
21st-century Nigerian actors
University of Texas at Austin alumni
Year of birth missing (living people)
Participants in Nigerian reality television series
Nigerian male film actors
Nigerian male singers
Big Brother (franchise) contestants
Yoruba people
Nigerian male musicians